Acacia leptostachya, commonly known as Townsville wattle or slender wattle, is a shrub or small tree belonging to the genus Acacia and the subgenus Juliflorae that is native to north eastern Australia.

Description
It has hairy ribbed branchlets with resinous young shoots. Like most species of Acacia it has phyllodes rather than true leaves. The evergreen phyllodes have silvery coloured hairs and a  narrowly elliptic to lanceolate shape that can be straight or shallowly curved. The simple inflorescences occur in pairs on racemes.

Taxonomy
Th species was first formally described by the botanist George Bentham in 1864 as part of the work Flora Australiensis, it was reclassified as Racosperma leptostachyum by Leslie Pedley in 1987 then transferred back to genus Acacia in 2001. Other synonyms include Acacia capillosa and Acacia argentea and is commonly confused with Acacia conspersa.
The specific epithet is derived from the Greek words lepto meaning slender and stachys meaning ear of corn in reference to the shape of the flower spikes.

Distribution
It is endemic to central-eastern parts of Cape York Peninsula from around Coen in the north extending through coastal and inland areas to around Maryborough and south of Charleville in the south. It is found in a variety of habitat growing in deep sandy or skeletal soils overlaying granite or sandstone bedrock as a part of Eucalyptus woodland communities or Triodia grasslands.

Cultivation
The shrub or tree grows well a full sun position in dry well drained soils. It can be propagated from seed after seeds are scarified or treated with boiling water.

See also
List of Acacia species

References

leptostachya
Flora of Queensland
Taxa named by George Bentham
Plants described in 1864